Ganjam railway station is a railway station on the East Coast Railway network in the state of Odisha, India. It serves Ganjam town. Its code is GAM. It has four platforms. Passenger, MEMU, Express trains halt at Ganjam railway station.

Major trains

 Hirakhand Express
 Bhubaneshwar–Visakhapatnam Intercity Express
 Puri–Tirupati Express

See also
 Ganjam district

Gallery

References

Railway stations in Ganjam district
Khurda Road railway division